The Zhenfan Commandery was one of the Four Commanderies of the Chinese Han dynasty located on the Korean Peninsula. It existed between 108 BC and 82 BC.

History
In 108 BC, the Zhenfan Commandery was established under Youzhou by the Han dynasty. 
According to Maolingshu (茂陵書) compiled in the Han dynasty, the Zhenfan Commandery  consisted of fifteen counties each, and was ruled from the Sa (Hanja:霅) county, which was 3,000 km from Chang’an. Its territorial jurisdiction is unclear. In 82 BC, Zhenfan Commandery was abolished.

Controversy
There are two theories for the location of the Zhenfan Commandery. One theory has it located in the north of the Korean peninsula and the other further south. In the academic community, the southern theory is preferred. However, there are also some views that the Zhenfan Commandery was in the Gyeongsang Province, Chungcheong Province or in the southern part of Korea which includes the Gyeongsang Province and Jeolla Province.

Historical revisionism
In the North Korean academic community and some parts of the South Korean academic community, the fact that at least part of the Korean peninsula was annexed by Han dynasty has been denied. They claim that the Four Commandaries of Han were actually located outside the Korean peninsula. They consider that the Four Commandaries were located in the Liaodong Commandery. In this theory, the location of Zhenfan Commandery is almost same as the eastern part of Liaodong Commandery.

These views are not accepted by the academic communities in the United States, China and Japan.

See also
Four Commanderies of Han
Lelang Commandery
Lintun Commandery
Xuantu Commandery
Daifang commandery
Canghai Commandery

Notes

References

Bibliography
 譚其驤等『中國歷史地圖集』北京・中国地图出版社、1974年
 周振鶴『西漢政區地理』北京・人民出版社、1987年
 李曉傑『東漢政區地理』濟南：山東教育出版社、1999年

100s BC establishments
Four Commanderies of Han